{{Infobox person
| image= Minnie Love.jpg 
| caption = Minnie Love, picture don the sheet music cover of "Ill Make a Man of You published in 1914
| name = Minnie Love
| birth_name = Minnie Maude Pearce-Monks
| other_names  =  Minnie Maude Pearce-Brown, Minnie Maude Cyril
| birth_place = Bristol, England, United Kingdom
| birth_date = 1888
| death_place = Coogee, New South Wales  Australia
| death_date = 
| occupation  =  
}} 
Minnie Love (1888 – 2 August 1967) was an English-born actress, producer, comedienne and singer.

Biography 
Love was born as Minnie Maude Pearce-Monks, in Bristol, England, United Kingdom she was the niece of Lilly Earnest, the later named Lady Mansell, she was best known for her roles in musical comedies during the 1920s in her native country and in Australia, she appeared in plays Aladdin and Cinderella, but was best known for her role as The Pink Lady in play The Cinema Star and her song "The Broken Doll", as well as the play The Bing Boys and song "I'll Make a Man of You" having been discovered appearing in a vaudeville theatre in London at the age of 15, she came to the latter country where she appeared in revue, variety and stage plays, as well as plays made for radio and television. She made her television debut in 1958, stating the new medium literally gave her the chance to indulge in her first love which was the theatre, noting also musical theatre had lost a lot of its former glamour in theatre venues since the early days of Irene Vanbrugh and Marie Tempest, and when performers were given bouquets at the end of performances by patrons. Her TV debut was a role in R. C. Sheriffs, Miss Mabel opposite Walter Pym and had a role in the serial Blue Hills. As a performer she was also known for her impersonations of music hall performers including Dame Gracie Fields, Vesta Tilley and Marie Lloyd. She made her TV debut in Miss Mabel (1958).

Select CreditsA Tongue of Silver'' (1959)

References

External links
Minnie Love at Ausstage

1888 births
1967 deaths
Australian stage actresses